Susan Kodicek (born Zuzana Oprsalova; 25 September 1947 - 11 April 2011), also known as Hannah Kodicek, was a Czechoslovakian actress active during the period 1977-90.  Her most prominent role was as Irina in Tinker Tailor Soldier Spy. She went on to work in children's entertainment in Britain, including children's puppet performances such as Pullover (1982), Sporting Bear (1982), Hobart's Hobbies (1982) and Foxtales (1985), various other television programmes, and a website. She wrote a book on theatre for children in 1977. 

In 1994, Kodicek wrote and directed the film A Pin for the Butterfly, starring Hugh Laurie and Joan Plowright. The film was inspired by her memories of growing up in Stalinist Czechoslovakia.

She moved back to the Czech Republic in 2001. She died in 2011 of pancreatic cancer, aged 63.

References

1947 births
2011 deaths
Czech television actresses